Cedar Shores is an unincorporated community in Cedar Creek Township, Allen County, in the U.S. state of Indiana.

Geography
This is about 1/4 mile north of Cedar Creek, which it was probably named for.

References

Unincorporated communities in Allen County, Indiana
Unincorporated communities in Indiana
Fort Wayne, IN Metropolitan Statistical Area